The Breda A.3 was a prototype twin-engined biplane, designed by Società Italiana Ernesto Breda, as a night bomber in 1924.

Design and development
After entering the civil aviation market, in the early part of the 1920s, Breda envisaged its first military aircraft design, the A.3. biplane bomber, utilizing the sesquiplane configuration, also featuring a biplane tail and four engines arranged in tandem nacelles. Early test flights with the SPA 6A engines showed very modest performance, so it was decided to replace the four SPA 6As with two Lorraine 12Db V-12 engines, each yielding . However, this modification failed to translate into much better performance, and development of the A.3 was halted.

Given the disappointing performance of the A.3, Breda conceived a new night bomber with better performance than the A.3 the Breda A.8.

Specifications

References 

A.3
1920s Italian bomber aircraft
Biplanes
Aircraft first flown in 1924